Wafangdian, formerly Fuhsien (Fuxian) or Fu County, is one of the two "northern county-level cities", the other being Zhuanghe, under the administration of Dalian, located in the south of Liaoning province, China. The city is famous for its ball bearing industry. Wafangdian Bearing Factory is the largest bearing manufacturer in Asia and was initially built by the Japanese during World War II. The city borders the prefecture-level city of Yingkou to the northeast.

Overview

There are rich mines here. Wafangdian is a newly developed city of diamond in the East and its deposits of diamond account for 54% of the national proven diamond deposits. The deposits of the limestone reach over 400,000,000 cubic metres. Wafangdian is famous for bearings and apples in China. Wafangdian has solid industry base, fast-developing agriculture, convenient transportation and telecommunications.

Climate
Wafangdian has a four-season, monsoon-influenced, humid continental climate (Köppen Dwa), with long, cold, windy but dry winters, and humid and very warm summers. The area experiences a seasonal delay due to the influence of the nearby ocean, which also helps temper the summers. Close to half of the annual precipitation falls in July and August alone. The frost-free period is 165−185 days per annum.

Administrative divisions
There are 11 subdistricts, 13 towns, 6 townships, and 2 ethnic townships under the city's administration:

Subdistricts

Towns

Townships

Ethnic Townships

Economy

Wafangdian's basic industry is industry, agriculture, fishing, and mining. Bearing industry is the main income for the citizen. Nearly 50% population engage in the bearing business. It is called the "bearing capital" of China, more than 400 bearing factories in this city, including the Chinese No. 1 brand "ZWZ". Wafangdian also produces apples and other fruits.  Its fishing industry prospers in the Bohai Sea. It is also noted for producing diamonds.

Wafangdian is also quickly industrialized. China's largest bearing company (ZWZ), established in 1938, is also located here.  Wafangdian is also noted for the Changxing Island Seaport Industrial Area and Hongyanhe Nuclear Power Station.

For its sightseeing locations, there is Laomao Mountain, located in the eastern part, on the border with Pulandian City.

Coastal Area
Wafangdian has 461 kilometres of coastline and the annual aquatic output is over 250,000 tons including sea cucumber, prawn, clam, crab, mullet, Spanish mackerel, jellyfish, scallop, abalone and mantis-shrimp etc. The following thirteen towns and communes belong to this area: Changxingdao, Jiaoliudao, Donggang, Fuzhouwan, Paotai, Xianyuwan, Yongning, Xiyang, Tuoshan and Santai, etc.

Investment Area for the Agriculture and Native Products Process
Wafangdian has rich agriculture and native products. The total export value exceeds RMB 1 billion yuan in 1999. The main products include meat-chick, bee-honey, peanut, dried-gourd, burdock, horseradish, red-bean and other products. The products are mainly produced and processed in the following 14 towns: Fuzhoucheng Town, Laohutun Town, Paotai Town, Yong-ning Town, etc..

Subarea for Industry Production
Wafangdian has a solid industry base with complete product kinds. There are many industries such as bearings, parts for auto and the agriculture machinery, castings, machinery process, foodstuff, textile, and garment, etc.. The following towns and communes include this subarea: Yongning, Laohutun, Yandian, and the Subdistricts of Zhuhua, etc..

Investment Area for Fruit Process
Wafangdian has rich resources in fruit. The total output reached over 300,000 tons in 1999, The main fruits are as following: apple, pear, plum, peach, strawchew, apricot, and grape, etc.. Thirteen towns and communes belong to this subarea: Wanjialing, Songshu Tucheng, and Gangdian Subdistrict, etc..

Investment Subarea for Tourism and Service in Wafangdian
Wafangdian has a beautiful beach, sand, scenic spots, and a natural warm spring. All this provides good conditions for tours here. The following places are satisfied for tourism service, they are Changxingdiao Town, Liguan Town, Xutun Town, Xianyuwan Town, and Tuoshan Commune, etc.

Economic Development Zone

Wafangdian Economic Development Subarea is located in the south-west of Wafangdian. It is two kilometres from the centre of the city. The planned area of the Economic Development Zone is  including the Hi-tech Garden, Industry Process Area, Storage and Transportation Area, Living Area and the Service Area and also there is the green area. The roads have been built now and the "five-through and one flat" engineering will be finished soon.

See also

 Changxing Island

References

External links 
 Wafangdian City home page 

 
Cities in Liaoning
Districts of Dalian